Nepali Sahitya Parishad (Nepali:नेपाली साहित्य परिषद सिक्किम) is a Literary organisation of Nepali language and literature in Sikkim which was established in the year 1984. The organisation mainly engaged in publication and promotion of literary dialogue and ceaselessly endeavored in promoting good taste and healthy reading habits to the like minded people, and groups through seminars, lectures, symposia, discussions, readings and performances, to increase the pace of mutual translations through workshops and individual assignments and to develop a serious literary culture through the publications of journals, monographs, individual creative works of every genre, anthologies, encyclopedias, dictionaries, bibliographies, who's who of writers and histories of literature. The head office of same is located at Jeewan Theeng Marg, Development Area, Gangtok, Sikkim 737101.

See also 
 Manipuri Sahitya Parishad
 Sahitya Akademi

References

External links
 Official website of Nepali Sahitya Parishad Sikkim in Nepali language

Nepali language
Organizations established in 1981
Nepalese literature
Indic literature societies

1981 establishments in India
Nepali literary institutions